{{DISPLAYTITLE:C11H13NO3}}
The molecular formula C11H13NO4 may refer to:

 Hydrastinine
 Methylone
 Streptazolin
 Toloxatone